Dyke Acland Bay (previously: Acland Bay) is an Arctic waterway in Qikiqtaaluk Region, Nunavut, Canada. Located off southern Bathurst Island, the bay is an arm of Parry Channel.

It is named after Sir Thomas Dyke Acland, 10th Baronet.

References

Bays of Qikiqtaaluk Region